Étienne Rey (1 March 1879 – 16 February 1965) was a French writer, dramatist and literary critic and one of the first best-seller writers of the Grasset publisher.

His play La belle aventure, co-written with Robert de Flers and Gaston Arman de Caillavet was premiered in 1913 at the Théâtre du Vaudeville, and played again numerous times. It has been adapted to the screen in 1917, 1932 and 1942 under the title The Beautiful Adventure.

Works 
 1911: Sous la Lumière rouge, drama in 3 acts
 1912: La renaissance de l'orgueil français, Ed. Grasset
 1913: La belle aventure: comedy in three acts (with Gaston Arman de Caillavet and Robert de Flers), performed at the Théâtre de l'Odéon in 1927 and 1949
 1924: Ce que femme veut: comedy in three acts
 1925: Éloge du mensonge, Ed. Hachette
 1926: Le Livre de Stendhal sur l'amour
 1929: La Vie amoureuse de Berlioz, Ed. Flammarion

References

External links 
 Quotes by Étienne Rey

20th-century French dramatists and playwrights
French literary critics
1879 births
1965 deaths